Crawford State Park is a Colorado State Park that encompasses Crawford Reservoir located about  south of the town of Crawford in Delta County, Colorado.

The  park was established in 1964 on the shore of Crawford Reservoir, a  lake with boat ramps and a swimming beach.  Other facilities include camp sites, picnic sites and a visitors center.  The park has  of trails available to both hikers and bicyclists.  Plant communities include pinyon-juniper woodlands, sagebrush and small areas of west slope grassland.  Wetland and riparian areas are around the reservoir and below the dam.

References

State parks of Colorado
Protected areas established in 1964
Protected areas of Delta County, Colorado
Protected areas of Montrose County, Colorado
1964 establishments in Colorado